Roque del Este (Spanish for "rock of the east") is a small uninhabited island in the Canary Islands, located  northeast of the island of Lanzarote. The island is part of the Chinijo Archipelago, which is administratively part of the municipality of Teguise.

Roque del Este is the easternmost island of the Chinijo archipelago, and it is the second smallest. Like the rest of the Canary Islands, it is of volcanic origin. Its highest point is 84 m. The island is part of the integral nature reserve Los Islotes, which is part of the natural park Chinijo Archipelago.

References

External links

Islands of the Canary Islands
Uninhabited islands of Spain